The Bellsbank meteorite is a hexahedrite iron meteorite with abundant schreibersite. It is classified as a member of the IIG group. It was found in Bellsbank, South Africa in 1955.

Discovery and naming
The meteorite was found in 1955 near Bellsbank, northwest of Kimberley (South Africa).
The meteorite was first described in 1959.

Description
The meteorite is hexahedrite iron meteorite. It consists of meteoric iron (exclusively kamacite) and schreibersite. The surface of the meteorite is pitted and weathered. Upon etching the meteorite shows Neumann lines. The meteoric iron has Nickel concentrations as low as 1.6%.

Classification
The Bellsbank meteorite was the type specimen of the grouplet called "Bellsbank Trio". After 5 meteorites were found the grouplet was renamed IIG group.

References

See also
 Glossary of meteoritics

Meteorites found in South Africa